Manam Pola Mangalyam is a 1953 Indian Tamil language comedy film directed by P. Pullaiah. The film features Gemini Ganesan and Savithri in the lead roles. No print of the film is known to survive, making it a lost film.

Plot

Cast 
Credits adapted from The Hindu:

Male cast
 R. Ganesh
 K. Sarangapani
 Friend Ramasami
 T. N. Sivathanu
 T. N. Meenakshi
 K. Natarajan
 C. Rajarathnam
 S. Peer Mohammed
 T. K. Kalyanam
 G. V. Sharma
 V. P. Balaraman
 Gundu Mani
 Loose Arumugam
 Kottapuli Jayaraman

Female cast
 Savithri
 Surabhi Balasaraswathi
 M. R. Santhanalakshmi

Production 
Manam Pola Mangalyam was directed by P. Pullaiah and produced by Narayanan and Company. The storyline was written by Telugu screenwriter Vempati Sadhasivabramham, the Tamil script by Umachandran and K. V. Srinivasan. All three men received credit onscreen for the story and screenplay. Gemini Ganesan (then known as R. Ganesh) was cast as the male lead. He appeared in a dual role, one of his characters being an asylum escapee. Savitri and Surabhi Balasaraswathi played the female leads. Although Ganesan was the male lead, K. Sarangapani, who played an ageing man wanting to marry the heroine, received top billing in the film's credits.

Soundtrack 
The soundtrack was composed by Addepalli Rama Rao, with lyrics by Kanaka Surabhi. Playback singers are V. J. Varma, A. M. Rajah, M. L. Vasanthakumari, P. Leela, Radha Jayalakshmi, Jikki & P. Suseela.

One of the soundtrack's hit numbers was "Maappillai Doi", performed by A. M. Rajah and P. Leela.

Reception 
The film became a major commercial success, and a breakthrough in the careers of both Savitri and Ganesan. The duo would subsequently act in many films together which became successful. Film historian Randor Guy praised the fact that Ganesan "did not indulge in fisticuffs every fifth scene, nor did he deliver jaw-breaking, alliterative and seemingly endless passages of dialogue." He said the film would be "Remembered for the excellent performances of the new hero in a double role, Gemini Ganesh, Savithri and Sarangapani and the melodious tunes of Rama Rao which are still fondly remembered by old-timers."

References

External links 

Films directed by P. Pullayya
Indian comedy films
Lost Indian films
1953 films
1950s lost films
Lost comedy films
Films scored by Addepalli Rama Rao